The Moral Case for Fossil Fuels is a 2014 book by Alex Epstein that advocates for the expansion of fossil fuels. Epstein, is a political commentator who runs the Center for Industrial Progress, a for-profit think tank.

Reception
The book was a New York Times and Wall Street Journal bestseller.

The book received praise from conservative papers and organizations such as The Wall Street Journal, Barron's, National Review, Reason,  The Washington Free Beacon, and The Morning Sun of Pittsburg, Kansas, along with think tanks the Independent Institute and The Heartland Institute.

However, the book was heavily criticized by many mainstream news outlets and journalists, with critical reviews published by Inside Higher Ed, The Huffington Post, The Guardian, and Our World, a publication of the United Nations University. Jason Wilson of The Guardian noted that Epstein has a close association with conservative advocacy groups and receives funding from the Koch brothers and that "Epstein's work has been popular and influential on the right because it is a particularly fluent, elaborate form of climate denialism." 

In 2014, Epstein was interviewed by Peter Thiel at an event hosted by the energy startup Tachyus. Thiel also provided a blurb for the book.

In December 2014, political commentator John McLaughlin called Epstein "most original thinker of the year" for his book during McLaughlin's yearly The McLaughlin Group roundup.

References

2014 non-fiction books
American non-fiction books
Books about capitalism
Books by Alex Epstein
English-language books
Business books
Climate change denial
Fossil fuels
Objectivist books
Portfolio (publisher) books